Alessandro Umberto Cagno, Umberto Cagno, nicknamed Sandrin (2 May 1883 – 23 December 1971) was an Italian racing driver, aviation pioneer and powerboat racer.

Apprenticed at 13 to a Turin engineering factory he was later recruited by Giovanni Agnelli as employee number 3 at F.I.A.T. (Fiat), where he progressed to be a test driver, Agnelli's personal driver and works racing team driver. In 1906 he won the inaugural Targa Florio in Sicily after switching to the  Itala team.

Cagno co-founded 'AVIS-Voisin' (Atelier Voisin Italie Septentrionale) to build Voisin aircraft under licence. He designed and tested aircraft, founded Italy's first flying school in Pordenone, and was the first person to fly above Venice. After volunteering as a pilot for the Italo-Turkish War (1911–1912) in Libya he invented a bomb aiming device.

Biography
Cagno was born in Turin into a working-class family, his father may have been a coal-merchant. Aged 13 he began working as an engineering apprentice at Storero, a local factory.

Motoring

Career
Cagno was apprenticed at 'Storero' in Turin, a builder of carriages, omnibuses and bicycles, that had started to build Phoenix motorised tricycles under license to the German Daimler company (Daimler-Motoren-Gesellschaft). His skill and passion for mechanics lead to him becoming the riding mechanic for Luigi Storero who drove both a De Dion-Bouton tricycle and then his own design of 1.75HP Daimler engined Phoenix tricycle at early cyclecar competitions. They competed at the Piacenza Trotting track (Pista del Trotto) and in the Piacenza-Cremona-Borgo-Piacenza road race.

Giovanni Agnelli, who used a Storero racing tricycle, recruited Cagno as the 3rd worker hired by F.I.A.T. (known as Fiat after 1906) and asked Luigi Storero to create a racing department. The staff included Cagno, Vincenzo Lancia and Felice Nazzaro, and they raced in Italy, France, Germany, Austria, the Netherlands, Belgium, Russia and the USA.

Cagno worked as both a F.I.A.T. test-driver and the personal driver of Giovanni Agnelli. He was the first person to drive a truck from Turin to Moscow, opened the first Fiat branch in Turin and was a champion powerboater.

Motor racing

From 1901 to 1905 he raced for F.I.A.T., predominantly at Italian mountain races, his first event was at Saluzzo in 1901 where he finished third and fourth in two handicap events. His first international race was aged 18 in 1902 when he finished second at the Circuit of Ardennes in Belgium.

In addition to driving he still worked as Luigi Storero's riding mechanic, so in 1902 he participated in the Sassi – Superga hillclimb; the Susa–Moncenisio hillclimb; and the Padua Sprint race on the 10 km road between Padua and Bovolenta. In 1903 he was the riding-mechanic for Vincenzo Lancia in the Race of Death from Paris to Madrid, but they retired their F.I.A.T. 24 hp before the race was stopped at Bordeaux.

His first victory came in July 1904 driving the 100 hp F.I.A.T. at the Susa-Mont Cenis (Susa-Moncenisio) hill-climb (or he finished second, 8 seconds behind Felicce Nazarro in another F.I.A.T.).

He finished third at the Gordon Bennett Cup at Puy de Dôme in 1905 and finished fourth at the Mont Ventoux hillclimb, accompanied at these events by Felice Nazzaro this was the first international success of Fiat. Later in 1905 he finished 3rd in the Circuit of Milano, 2nd in the Susa-Montecenisio hillclimb, and first in the Mont Ventoux hillclimb in France.

In 1906 he switched from Fiat to another Turin based manufacturer, Itala (Fab Auto Itala SA.), with whom he won both the inaugural Targa Florio in 1906 and the Coppa della Velocita in 1907.

Cagno drove the Itala to fifth position at the 1907 Kaiser Preis, completing the two laps in 3 hours 07 minutes 26 seconds. His entry number was 35A, indicating that he was the "A" driver in Team 35.

The other members of the Itala team finished eighth and tenth. The car subsequently raced in the US and lapped Brooklands at over 100 mph and is now in the National Motor Museum at Beaulieu, England. In the Vanderbilt Cup on Long Island he finished 7th with the Itala, 1 lap behind Louis Wagner in the winning Darracq.

In 1908 he drove the new 12-cylinder Itala to finish 11th at the French Grand Prix and 3rd in the Coppa Florio at Bologna. The team then entered the 1908 American Grand Prize at Savannah but he retired after a spring broke on lap 12.

Return to Fiat
Cagno had lost interest in motor racing by around 1910, concentrating on aviation, but in 1912 he returned to Fiat as both 'Chief Tester of racing cars' and 'General motor vehicle Tester'.

He made an unsuccessful return to racing at the 1914 French Grand Prix where he completed 10 laps before his Fiat retired after damaging a valve.

During the First World War he ran the General Testing Office for the Italian and French armies.

Cagno returned to racing again in the 1920s when he won the 1923 Italian Grand Prix for voiturettes and the Leningrad-Moscow-Tbilisi event in a Fiat.

Aviation

By 1909 Cagno had lost interest in racing and turned to aviation, gaining his pilot's licence and becoming the instructor at Cameri about 90 km northeast of Turin.

In October 1909 Cagno collaborated with two engineers at Cameri, Clovis Thouvenot and Gino Galli, to establish 'AVIS-Voisin' (Atelier Voisin Italie Septentrionale), to build Voisin aircraft under licence. With these aircraft he competed in the Brescia-Montichiari event.

He both designed and tested aircraft, also founding Italy's first flying school at Pordenone in 1910.

In Venice on 19 February 1911, Cagno made six flights in his 50 hp Farman III from the beach at the Lido di Venezia despite the fog. The plane had been transported in pieces from Pordenone and assembled on the skating rink of the Excelsior Hotel. On 3 March he made the first flight over the city and continued daily until 6 March, the last day of Carnival. A passenger was selected by public lottery,  the winner sold his ticket to a lawyer named Casellati.

After volunteering for the Italo-Turkish War in Libya in 1911, he built the first Italian bomber (or "added a grenade launcher"(or a crude aiming device consisting of an angled surface or tube)).

Motor-boating
Cagno competed in motorboat races using F.I.A.T. powered boats. He won the Monaco meeting in 1906.

Death and commemoration
Cagno retired from motor-racing in 1923, but continued living in his family home in Turin until his death in 1971. At the time of his death, he was the last surviving participant of the first international Grand Prix motor race ever held.

He recorded an interview in 1961 which is used at the Museo Nazionale dell'Automobile (Museo Nazionale dell'automobile Biscaretti) where he describes his days in racing:

Results

References

External links

Targa Florio info - Cagno

1883 births
1971 deaths
Racing drivers from Turin
Grand Prix drivers
Aviation pioneers
Italian aviators